Magdalena Szaj (born 12 February 1995) is a Polish football midfielder, currently playing for FFC Turbine Potsdam.

External links 
 

1995 births
Living people
Polish women's footballers
Polish expatriate sportspeople in Germany
Expatriate women's footballers in Germany
1. FFC Turbine Potsdam players
People from Olsztyn County
People from Warmian-Masurian Voivodeship
Women's association football midfielders